The Antidote is a collaboration mixtape by American hip hop recording artists Fashawn and The Alchemist, released on September 9, 2009. The album contains 11 original tracks, with Fashawn rapping over The Alchemist's production. It served as a warmup for Fashawn's debut solo album Boy Meets World, which was released on October 22, 2009.

Track listing

References 

Fashawn albums
2009 albums
Albums produced by the Alchemist (musician)